The Strong Copper (from Sumerian urud niĝ kalag-ga) in Sumerian religion was one of the valuable items seized by Ninurta, patron god of Lagash, in ancient Iraq. This spoil was hung "on the inside pole pin" of his chariot according to the ancient source (lines 55–63 ).

See also
Ninlil
Sumerian religion
Anzû

External links
 The Electronic Text Corpus of Sumerian Literature 

Mesopotamian mythology